Regional 1 Midlands (until 2022–23 known as Midlands Premier and up until 2016–17 known as National League 3 Midlands) is a level five semi-professional league in the English rugby union system. It is one of six leagues at this level. When this division began in 1987 it was known as Midlands Division 1. The format of the league was changed at the beginning of the 2009–10 season following a reorganisation by the Rugby Football Union (RFU), and the name change from National League 3 to Premier was introduced for the 2017–18 season by the RFU in order to lessen confusion for what is a series of regional leagues. Midlands Premier is the highest regional rugby union league in the English Midlands.

Format
The club that finishes as champions are automatically promoted to National League 2 West. Relegated teams drop down to either, Regional 2 East Midlands, Regional 2 North Midlands or Regional 2 West Midlands, depending on there location, and other factors such as the location of relegated and promoted teams in other divisions.

The season runs from September to May and comprises twenty-two rounds of matches, with each club playing each of its rivals home and away. The results of the matches contribute points to the league table as follows:
    4 points are awarded for a win
    2 points are awarded for a draw
    0 points are awarded for a loss, however
    1 losing (bonus) point is awarded to a team that loses a match by 7 points or fewer
    1 additional (bonus) point is awarded to a team scoring 4 tries or more in a match

Current season

Participating teams and locations

2021–22

Participating teams and locations
Ten of the fourteen teams participated in last season's competition. They are joined by one relegated side, Scunthorpe (from National League 2 North), while the three teams promoted into the division are Dudley Kingswinford (from Midlands 1 West, Oundle and Syston (both from Midlands 1 East. Last seasons champions, Bournville were promoted into National League 2 North. Teams relegated from the division were Kettering and Peterborough (who drop to Midlands 1 East). Also not returning are South Leicester who withdrew from the league during the 2019–20 season and drop to Midlands 4 East (South) for the coming season.

The teams competing in 2021–22 achieved their places in the league based on performances in 2019–20, the 'previous season' column in the table below refers to that season not 2020–21.

Final league table

2020–21
On 30 October 2020 the RFU announced that due to the coronavirus pandemic a decision had been taken to cancel Adult Competitive Leagues (National League 1 and below) for the 2020/21 season meaning Midlands Premier was not contested.

2019–20

Participating teams and locations
Nine of the fourteen teams participated in last season's competition. They are joined by two relegated sides; Peterborough Lions and South Leicester (relegated from National League 2 North), while the three teams promoted into the division are Bromsgrove, Kettering and Paviors.  In order to address an imbalance of teams at level 5, Bedford Athletic have been level transferred into the division from London & South East Premier. Birmingham & Solihull were initially relegated into the division from National League 2 South but decided to drop out of the league system altogether (joining the Greater Birmingham Merit Leagues) as they became an amateur club.

Last seasons champions, Scunthorpe were promoted into National League 2 North, along with Luctonians who won their play-off game against North Premier runners up Blaydon.  Teams relegated from the division included Derby and Syston (who drop to Midlands 1 East) and Lichfield (who fall to Midlands 1 West).

2018–19

Participating teams and locations
Nine of the fourteen teams participated in last season's competition. They are joined by Luctonians and Sheffield (relegated from National League 2 North), Broadstreet (relegated from National League 2 South), while the two teams promoted into the division are Burton and Syston.  Last seasons champions Birmingham & Solihull were promoted into National League 2 South following a level transfer, while runners up Peterborough Lions RFC were promoted into National League 2 North after winning their play-off game against Hull.  Teams relegated from the division included Old Halesonians, Longton and Newbold-on-Avon who all drop to Midlands 1 West.

2017–18

Participating teams and locations

Nine of the fourteen teams participated in last season's competition. Scunthorpe were relegated from National League 2 North while the three teams promoted into the division included Newbold-on-Avon,
Newport (Salop) and Bournville.  Last seasons champions, Broadstreet, were promoted into National League 2 South following a level transfer, while runners-up Sheffield went into National League 2 North, having won their playoff game.  Teams relegated from the league included Bedford Athletic and Syston, with Sandbach given a reprieve by the RFU in light of the London Welsh liquidation, by virtue of being the best ranked third bottom side in tier 5 for 2016–17.  Finally Towcestrians were level transferred from Midlands Premier into London & South East Premier, while Doncaster Phoenix were level transferred into Midlands Premier from North Premier to address an imbalance of teams in the three divisions. Birmingham & Solihull won the title on 7 April.

2016–17

Participating teams and locations

Eight of the fourteen teams participated in last season's competition. They are joined by Broadstreet who were relegated from National 2 North while four teams were promoted into the league – Bedford Athletic, Bridgnorth, Derby and Towcestrians (who were level transferred from the south-west league on promotion) – as well as Sheffield who were level transferred from National League 3 North having finished 7th the previous season. Scunthorpe (champions) and Hinckley (play-off) were promoted into National League 2 North while Old Northamptonians were relegated to Midlands 1 East and Sutton Coldfield and Newport (Salop) both dropped to Midlands 1 West. In order to address a league imbalance due to only one team coming down from National League 2 South, Bromsgrove (who had finished 11th), were level transferred to National League 3 South West.

Final league table

Promotion play-off
Each season, the runners-up in the National League 3 Midlands, and National League 3 North participate in a play-off for promotion to National League 2 North. The team with the best playing record, in this case Rossendale, hosted the match and lost to their opponents Sheffield, 31 – 32.

2015–16

Participating teams and locations

Despite leading the table for most of the season Hinckley lost 13 – 23 on the final week-end of the season to Scunthorpe, to finish in second place for the second season in a row. Scunthorpe started the day four points behind and finished top due to winning one more match over the season. Two of last seasons promoted teams were relegated; Newport (Salop) to Midland 1 West and Old Northamptonians to Midland 1 East. The third relegated team is Sutton Coldfield.

Final league table

Promotion play-off
Each season, the runners-up in the National League 3 Midland, and National League 3 North participate in a play-off for promotion to National League 2 North. The team with the best playing record, in this case Hinckley, host the match and they beat their opponents Wirral 33 – 20.

2014–15
Bournville
Bromsgrove (relegated from National 2 North)
Burton (promoted from Midlands 1 West)
Dudley Kingswinford (relegated from National 2 North)
Hinckley
Lichfield (promoted from Midlands 1 West)
Longton
Nuneaton
Old Halesonians
Peterborough Lions (promoted from Midlands 1 East)
Sandbach	
Scunthorpe
South Leicester
Sutton Coldfield

2013–14
Bedford Athletic (promoted from Midlands 1 East)
Bournville
Broadstreet RFC
Hinckley
Longton	
Lymm (transferred from National League 3 North)
Newport (Salop) RFC
Nuneaton
Old Halesonians (promoted from Midlands 1 West)
Sandbach	
Scunthorpe
South Leicester
Sutton Coldfield 
Syston

2012–13
Ampthill (transferred from National League 3 London/South East)
Bournville (promoted from Midlands 1 West)
Broadstreet RFC
Derby (promoted from Midlands 1 East)
Hinckley
Longton
Mansfield
Newport (Salop) RFC
Nuneaton (relegated from National Division 2 North)
Sandbach (promoted from North 1 West)
Scunthorpe
South Leicester
Sutton Coldfield (promoted from Midlands 1 West)
Syston

2011–12
Broadstreet 
Dudley Kingswinford (promoted from Midlands 1 West)
Hereford (relegated)
Hinckley
Longton
Manchester (relegated from National League 2 North)
Mansfield (promoted from Midlands 1 East)
Newport (Salop)
Old Northamptonians
Rugby Lions
Scunthorpe
South Leicester
Syston (promoted from Midlands 1 East)

2010–11
Broadstreet
Bromsgrove
Burton (promoted from Midlands 1 West)
Hereford
Kenilworth
Longton
Luton
Malvern
Newport (Salop)
Old Northamptonians (promoted from Midlands 1 West)
Peterborough
Scunthorpe (promoted from Midlands 1 East)
Sheffield Tigers
South Leicester

2009–10
First season as National 3 Midlands.

Ampthill (promoted from Midlands 1 East)
Bedford Athletic
Bromsgrove
Hereford 
Hinckley
Kenilworth
Kettering
Longton
Luctonians
Luton
Malvern
Newport RUFC
Peterborough
South Leicester

2007–08
Bedford Athletic
Broadstreet
Dudley Kingswinford
Dunstablians 
Kenilworth
Kingswinford
Longton
Loughborough Students
Luctonians
Newport (Salop)
Peterborough
Scunthorpe
South Leicester

Original teams

When league rugby began in 1987 this division (known as Midlands 1) contained the following teams:

Barkers Butts
Hinckley
Mansfield
Paviors
Peterborough
Stafford
Stockwood Park
Stoke-on-Trent
Walsall
Westleigh
Wolverhampton

Midlands Premier honours

Midlands 1 (1987–1992)
The original Midlands 1 was a tier 5 league with promotion to Area League North and relegation to either Midlands 2 East or Midlands 2 West.

Midlands 1 (1992–1993)
For the 1991–92 season Midlands 1 remained a tier 5 league with promotion to Area League North.  However, restructuring of the Midlands leagues meant that relegation was now to Midlands 2 (formerly Midlands 2 East and Midlands 2 West).

Midlands 1 (1993–1996)
The top six teams from Midlands 1 and the top six from North 1 were combined to create National 5 North.  Midlands 1 dropped to become a tier 6 league and was one of two feeder leagues for National 5 North.  Relegation continued to Midlands 2 (currently Midlands 1 East and Midlands 1 West)

Midlands 1 (1996–2000)
At the end of the 1995–96 season National 5 North was discontinued and Midlands 1 returned to being a tier 5 league. Promotion was now to National 4 North (currently National League 2 North), while relegation continued to Midlands 2 (currently split into Midlands 1 East and Midlands 1 West).

Midlands 1 (2000–2009)
Restructuring ahead of the 2000–01 season saw Midlands 1 remain a tier 5 league but promotion was now to National 3 North (formerly National 4 North) and relegation to either Midlands 2 East or Midlands 2 West (both formerly Midlands 2).

National League 3 Midlands (2009–2017)
The division was renamed National League 3 Midlands following a restructuring of the national leagues which led to changes at all levels. It remained a tier 5 league with promotion  to National League 2 North (formerly National League 3 North) and relegation to either Midlands 1 East or Midlands 1 West (formerly Midlands 2 East / Midlands 2 West).

Midlands Premier (2017–2022)
For the 2017–18 season all divisions at tier 5 were renamed from National League 3 to Premier meaning that National League 3 Midlands became known as Midlands Premier. Promotion continued to National League 2 North and relegation to either Midlands 1 East or Midlands 1 West.

Promotion play-offs
Between 2000–01 and 2019–20 there has been a play-off between the league runners-up of Midlands Premier and North Premier for the third and final promotion place to National League 2 North. The team with the superior league record has home advantage. As of the end of the 2019–20 season the northern teams have been stronger with twelve wins to the Midlands seven, while the home team has won thirteen times compared to the away teams six.

Number of league titles

Broadstreet (4)
Scunthorpe (3)
Bedford Athletic (2)
Birmingham & Solihull (2)
Hereford (2)
Rugby Lions (2)
Stoke-on-Trent (2)
Ampthill (1)
Barkers Butts (1)
Bournville (1)
Bromsgrove (1)
Dudley Kingswinford (1)
Hinckley (1)
Leicester Lions (1)
Longton (1)
Loughborough Students (1)
Luton (1)
Newport (Salop)
Rotherham (1)
South Leicester (1)
Towcestrians (1)
Walsall (1)
Whitchurch (1)

See also
 Midlands RFU
 English rugby union system
 Rugby union in England

Notes

References

5
1
Recurring sporting events established in 1987
Sports leagues established in 1987